Samuel Epstein (December 9, 1919 – September 17, 2001) was a Canadian-American geochemist who developed methods for reconstructing geologic temperature records using stable isotope geochemistry. He was elected to the United States National Academy of Sciences in 1977, and a fellow of the Royal Society of Canada in 1997.

Early years 
Sam Epstein was born in Kobryn, Belarus, then part of Poland, and as a child his family emigrated to Winnipeg, Manitoba. After receiving a B.Sc. in Geology and Chemistry (1941) and a M.Sc. in Chemistry (1942) from the University of Manitoba, Epstein completed his Ph.D. at McGill University under the supervision of Carl A. Winkler in 1944. His thesis focused on the synthesis and reaction kinetics of high explosives, including RDX and HMX. Epstein subsequently worked for the Canadian Atomic Energy Project for several years.

Career 
In 1947, Epstein moved to the United States to begin a research fellowship with Harold Urey's group at the University of Chicago. While at Chicago, Epstein, along with Ralph Buchsbaum, Heinz A. Lowenstam, C. R. McKinney and others developed the carbonate-water isotopic temperature scale, allowing  ancient ocean temperatures to be determined from precise measurements of 18O/16O in geological samples of calcium carbonate. This method is still the most widely used geochemical climate proxy for locations and times not sampled in ice core records.
 
Epstein joined the faculty of the California Institute of Technology in 1952, and continued to explore the new field of stable isotope geochemistry. He and his students used mass spectrometry to study natural variations in the isotopic abundances of hydrogen, carbon, oxygen and silicon, with applications to archeology, biochemistry, climatology, and geology.  He was awarded the Wollaston Medal of the Geological Society of London in 1993.

Epstein remained at Caltech as a Professor and Professor Emeritus until shortly before his death on September 17, 2001.

The European Association of Geochemistry awards a Science Innovation Award medal every five years named in his honour for work in isotope geochemistry.

References

External links
 Obituary, California Institute of Technology
 V. M. Goldschmidt award winners
Hugh P. Taylor Jr. and Robert N. Clayton, "Samuel Epstein", Biographical Memoirs of the National Academy of Sciences (2008)

1919 births
2001 deaths
California Institute of Technology faculty
Canadian geochemists
McGill University Faculty of Science alumni
University of Manitoba alumni
Wollaston Medal winners
Members of the United States National Academy of Sciences
Fellows of the Royal Society of Canada
Polish emigrants to Canada
Canadian emigrants to the United States
Presidents of the Geochemical Society
Recipients of the V. M. Goldschmidt Award